Lyn-Genet Recitas, (born March 26, 1965), also known as Lyn-Genet, is an American author and self-proclaimed nutritionist.

Career 
Lyn-Genet received her undergraduate and master's degrees from the non-accredited Clayton College of Natural Health.

She started her practice on the west coast of the US and has been running health centers in New York City and Westchester, New York. Lyn-Genet has staff in the US and Canada and sees clients in Hastings on Hudson, New York and Houston, Texas.

Books

References 
 (2011), More published an article on The Plan, a protocol developed by Recitas.
 (2012), USA Weekend featured Recitas' regimen in an article, as well.
 (2013), The Plan, by Recitas, was reviewed by Huffington Post Canada
 (2013), Women's Running Magazine made her cleanse the subject of this article.
 (2015), Village Voice highlighted both her new Cookbook and her Plan.

External links
 Official website

1965 births
Living people
American health care businesspeople
American health and wellness writers
American women nutritionists
American nutritionists
Diet food advocates
Writers from New York City